There are two individuals known as Basil the Confessor; one was a monk and the other Bishop of Parium.

Venerable Basil the Confessor
Venerable Basil the Confessor was an Eastern Orthodox saint who lived in the 8th century. During the iconoclast controversy, Basil and his teacher Procopius of Decapolis, were imprisoned by the Byzantine Emperor Leo III the Isaurian. Both languished in prison until the death of the emperor in 741, when they were released and returned to their monastery. He died peacefully in 750 and is venerated February 28 (New Style; March 13 Old Style).

Basil the Confessor, Bishop of Parium
Basil was a monk who was elected Bishop of Parium. In February 754 Emperor Constantine V convened a synod at Hieria to condemn the veneration of icons. Basil refused to sign the orders for their destruction, He subsequently avoided any dealings with the iconoclasts. For this he suffered much persecution, hunger and deprivation. He is commemorated April 12.

See also
 Byzantine Iconoclasm

References

8th-century Christian saints
Year of birth missing
750 deaths
Byzantine saints of the Eastern Orthodox Church
8th-century Byzantine monks
Byzantine Iconoclasm
Byzantine prisoners and detainees
Leo III the Isaurian